Myczkowce  (Mychkivtsi) is a village in the administrative district of Gmina Solina, within Lesko County, Subcarpathian Voivodeship, in south-eastern Poland.
In 1910–1914, new Ukrainian church instead of a wooden one from 1815, was built. A monumental structure was designed as a synthesis of Ukrainian, Byzantine and Romanesque architectural traditions. Religious community was affiliated with and the Diocese of Peremyshl`. After the deportation of Ukrainians, was used for the storage, and since 1979 - as a church for Polish Roman Catholic community
The village has a population of 510.

References

Villages in Lesko County